Climatecars is a London, England private hire car service which uses solely hybrid and electric cars in its fleet. The company promotes itself as a green alternative to black taxi and minicab companies based in London.

History 

Climatecars was founded in 2007 by Nicko Williamson, a University of Bristol graduate. Williamson studied the market and worked for an existing car service before starting his company.

Like other private car services, Climatecars cannot be hailed; they must be booked online or over the telephone, usually charge fixed prices, and can't use bus lanes.  Drivers pass a less stringent test that taxi drivers.

In 2011, the company raised £200,000 from Clydesdale bank and used the money to expand its fleet of vehicles. That year Williamson was voted Ernst & Young Entrepreneur of The Year, received a BusinessGreen Leader Award, and was also awarded the Young Entrepreneur of the Year award at the Fast Growth Business Awards Ceremony.

Climatecars provides Belu bottled water for its customers; the bottles are made from corn starch, and the company uses profits to support water development projects in Africa.

IN 2012 Climatecars released an iPhone app to help its customers order car service.

In 2013, Sam Cropper was appointed CEO of Climatecars. At that time the company was operating about 100 vehicles, but has since expanded to about 150.

In 2015, Climatecars was acquired by car service company Addison Lee, as a way of expanding its fleet while reducing average emission rates.

Technology and environment 

Climatecars uses hybrid and fully electric cars to keep emissions to a minimum. Their fleet is made up primarily of the Toyota Prius hybrid plus some fully electric Renault Fluence vehicles. Climatecars emissions from the Prius are 89 g/km and the Fluence is 71g/km (when charged off the UK grid), which is versus 233 g/km for the latest Black Taxi (LTI TX4).

References

External links 

Company website

Transport companies established in 2007
Taxis of the United Kingdom